Three-Handed Whist, also known as Widow Whist, is a variant of the trick-taking game Whist.

"Widow" whist is named because of an extra hand that is dealt just to the left of the dealer.  This extra hand is called the "widow" and players may have a chance to use the widow instead of their own hand.

Card rank 
A K Q J 10 9 8 7 6 5 4 3 2

 ♣ are trump.

Order of play 
 Everyone cuts the deck and high card is dealer.
 Deal out 4 hands, with the widow always being the first hand to the left of the dealer.  Each hand should have 13 cards.
 Now, the person just to the left of the dealer has first choice at the widow.  If the first person to choose has a good hand, he/she just passes it to the next person on their left.
 If someone takes the Widow, that person needs to collect 4 tricks total for that round.  Otherwise, only 3 tricks are needed to break even.
 After taking the widow, that person's hand is passed to the left (unless you are back to the dealer, in which case you are done).  If someone else would take that rejected hand, they only have to get 3 tricks.  Please note that if someone else rejected that hand, it's doubtful that you would want it.  However, if your hand is bad enough...
 Play begins with player to the left of the dealer.

 Every game of widow is played high, meaning you want to collect as many tricks as you can.  There is no granding process like in 4 player Minnesota whist.
 Each player is for him/herself.  No teams in 3 player widow whist.
 The person who originally picked the widow can choose to keep his hand instead.  However, that person still has to get 4 tricks because he/she picked up the widow.

Taking tricks 
Similar to 4 handed, the person who leads lays down a card from his/her hand.  Everyone must follow suit if they can (in clockwise motion).  If you don't have the suit, lay down any other card.  Highest card of the lead suit takes the trick, with the exception of the clubs suit.  Clubs are trump and will always take any other suit. Whoever takes the trick leads the next one.  Play continues until all cards are gone.  Dealer moves one to the left.

 Note:  You must follow suit if you can
 A rule variation: some people play if you don't have the lead suit, you must play a club if you have one.  (i.e., Hearts was lead, you have no hearts.  With this rule in place you would have to lay a club.)

Scoring 
 You can get negative scores.
 If you picked up the widow, you get 1 point for every trick over 4. (i.e., 2 tricks = −2 pts, 4 tricks = 0 pts, 5 tricks = 1 pt)
 If you didn't pick up the widow, you get 1 point for every trick over 3.  (i.e., 4 tricks = 1 point, 5 = 2 pts)

English card games
French deck card games
Whist